Le Bellot is the fifth ship of the  of cruise ships operated by Ponant.  Each member of the class has been allocated the name of a famous French explorer, and Le Bellot is named after Joseph René Bellot, a French naval officer and Arctic explorer.

Ponant's order for Le Bellot and a sister ship, the sixth of the class, was announced in March 2018. The hull of each ship was constructed by VARD in the builder's Tulcea yard in Romania; the steel cutting ceremony for both ships took place on 4 April 2018. Upon completion, the hulls were transferred to the builder's Søviknes facility in Ålesund, Norway, for final outfitting.

Le Bellot was delivered to Ponant in March 2020.

References

External links
 Compagnie du Ponant official site page about the ship
 Videos of Le Bellot at shipvideos.net

2020 ships
Ships built in Norway
Ships built in Romania
Ships of Compagnie du Ponant